Katapu or Kalapu is a traditional war cap or helmet used by the Dayaks of Borneo (Indonesia and Malaysia). The katapu is only worn during war.

Description
The Katapu is made of natural materials. It is woven from thick rattan strands that are split lengthways in the middle. It has a sturdy inner helmet that offers protection against sword blows. The helmet is often reinforced with other materials such as metal plates, large fish scales, pangolin scales, and the skins of bears, monkeys, and other animals. 

The decorations of the helmets are often designed in the shape of a monster head. Materials used for decoration include wattle, poultry feathers, claws, beaks, skulls of hornbills, human hair, hair of other living things, shells (including the Nassa shell), and the teeth of bears and panthers. Hornbill feathers can also be used a decorative status symbol for warriors who have already fought in war; the feathers can represent the number of enemies killed. 

The edge of the helmet can be framed with metal strips or wrapped in red flannel.

Katapu are used not only to protect against wounds, but also to act martially on the battlefield.

Variants 
There are different versions of the Katapu throughout Indonesia. 

Katapu Kaloi is a Sea Dayak war cap, made by sewing large fish scales on a cap made from a bast-like material.

Gallery

See also

Takula tofao
Paseki

References

Further reading
 George Cameron Stone: A Glossary of the Construction, Decoration and Use of Arms and Armor in All Countries and in All Times. With an Introduction by Donald J. LaRocca. Courier Dover Publications, Mineola NY 1999, p. 341.

Indonesian inventions
Medieval helmets
Combat helmets